Dry July Foundation is a not-for-profit organization that runs the annual Dry July campaign that challenges people to abstain from drinking alcohol for the month of July to support people affected by cancer. Since its inception, more than 290,000 participants have collectively raised over $73m AUD, helping to support more than 80 cancer support organizations across Australia and New Zealand.

The campaign 

Dry July encourages people to give up drinking alcohol for July and invites people to contribute them for their efforts. Participants nominate a cancer service where they want the funds they raise during the campaign to go.

Dry July provides a number of tools used to assist people with their fundraising. These include Golden Tickets; a donation minimum of $25, which allows participants a night off from their Dry July campaign, posters, social media images and general fundraising tips.

Dry July beneficiaries 

Dry July raises funds to create better environments and support networks for adult cancer patients and their families. To do this, Dry July partners with cancer services organizations across Australia and New Zealand. In order to become a Dry July beneficiary, cancer support organizations must submit an Expression of Interest. The cancer support organization must meet the Dry July beneficiary guidelines in order to ensure that the projects they wish to fund are patient-centric and focus on improving the well-being of adults living with cancer. Examples of eligible projects include entertainment systems, accommodation facilities, transportation to treatment, complementary therapy program costs, and improving waiting and treatment area facilities.

The list of Dry July Australian beneficiaries can be found at their website.

In 2016, Dry July New Zealand moved to a full grant program funding model. Previous beneficiaries of fundraising can be found on the New Zealand website.

Dry July grant program 
For the first time in 2014, the Dry July Foundation offered a grant program for cancer support organizations in Western Australia. Participants who signed up to take part in Dry July could choose to support the 'Dry July Foundation supporting WA', where the money raised would then be distributed via a grant program. In 2015, the Dry July Foundation expanded this grant program to the other states in Australia as well as in New Zealand for their New Zealand campaign.

Eligible organizations may request funding for projects via a Grant Funding Application. As per the Dry July campaign beneficiaries, projects funded via the Grant Application must be patient-centric and focus on improving the wellbeing of adults living with cancer.

Ambassadors 
Dry July's ambassadors have included:

 Adam Spencer

Milestones 

In 2008, Phil Grove, Brett Macdonald and Kenny McGilvary pledged to give up alcohol for a month to raise some money for their local hospital. After the challenge was picked up by 702 ABC Sydney's Adam Spencer, over 1,000 people signed up to Dry July, raising over $250,000.

In its second year, Dry July supported six cancer services around Australia. With 4,000 participants, the organization raised over $1.3 million.

In 2010, 9,000 people signed up to Dry July, raising $2.4million+ for 10 cancer services across Australia (with each Australian state and territory represented).

In 2011, Dry July had 11,500+ participants sign up and raise over $2.8million for 13 cancer services.

Dry July expanded internationally in 2012, with the first Dry July New Zealand taking place. Over 2,000 New Zealanders signed up and raised NZD$550,000+. In Australia, Dry July added an additional 7 cancer services to its beneficiary list, and raised over $3.7million from its 15,000+ participants.

In 2013, Dry July in Australia had over 18,000 participants raise $4.3million for their 31 beneficiaries. For the second Dry July New Zealand, over 4,000 people participated and raise over $765,000 for three beneficiaries: Auckland City Hospital, Wellington Hospital and Christchurch Hospital.

2014 saw Dry July raise $3.8 million for 37 cancer services across Australia, with 19,600+ participants signed up to the challenge.

In 2015, Dry July had 21,400 participants sign up and raise $4.1 million for 42 cancer support organizations in Australia.

Governance 
Dry July Foundation currently has six board members.

External links 
 Official Dry July Website

References 

Cancer fundraisers
Medical and health organisations based in Australia
Temperance organizations